Masrour Barzani (born 2 March 1969) is a Kurdish politician and serving as prime minister of the Kurdistan Region, an autonomous region of Iraq, since June 2019. He is also the chancellor of the Kurdistan Region Security Council and a member of the Kurdistan Democratic Party. He was sworn in as prime minister of the KRG’s ninth cabinet on 10 June 2019, after receiving 87 votes out of 97 legislators in the Kurdistan parliament.

Early life and education
He joined the Kurdish resistance fighters, known as Peshmerga or "those who face death", in 1985 at the age of 16. He was an active participant in the Battle of Khwakurk against Saddam Hussein's army in 1988. He also participated in the 1991 uprising against Saddam Hussein after the first Gulf War and filmed both events.

Despite this irregular childhood given the tumultuous nature of the Kurdish resistance, Barzani was able to complete his high school education in Iran. After seeing peace restored to the region in 1992, he went to London for a year-long course in English. Having successfully completed this, he continued on to receive a bachelor's degree with honors in International Studies from the American University in Washington, D.C. He continued studying Peace and Conflict Resolutions for his post graduate studies.

During his time in Washington, Barzani was actively involved in improving understanding of the Kurdish plight in America. He also established a Barzani Scholar-in-Residence program at American University in order to continue these efforts into the future.

Political career
In 1998, he returned to Kurdistan Region and was elected by the KDP's 12th Congress to the Central Committee. Later that same year he became part of the Kurdistan Democratic Party Leadership before being appointed as General Director of the Protection and Intelligence Agency. In 2010, he received the highest votes of the 13th Congress, was reelected to the Leadership Council and then selected as one of the Politburo members of the KDP. In 2012, he was appointed by his father Kurdistan Region President Masoud Barzani as Chancellor of the Kurdistan Region Security Council to oversee security, military intelligence and  existing intelligence services.

Under his stewardship, women have been officially added to the Kurdish security services. He was a vocal critic of many of the proposals found in the Iraq Study Group, authoring a Washington Post op-ed on the subject.

Barzani has also been credited with working to ensure that veterans of the Kurdish struggle who are members of his father's political party receive their pensions. In a January 2010 interview with the Jamestown Foundation, Masrour Barzani said that the Iraqi Constitution has laid out a clear solution for the status of the city of Kirkuk and other disputed areas.

In May 2016, Barzani authored a second op-ed in the Washington Post advocating an 'amicable' separation of Iraqi Kurdistan from the rest of Iraq. He called Iraq 'a conceptual failure, compelling peoples with little in common to share an uncertain future,' and announced the beginning of talks with the Iraqi Government in the lead up to a referendum.

Barzani Charity Foundation (BCF)
In 2005, he founded the Barzani Charity Foundation in Iraqi Kurdistan. The non-profit charity organization provides aid to the internally displaced, refugees as well as vulnerable locals, and is modeled on the life, struggle and principles of his Grandfather Mustafa Barzani. Its Orphan Sponsorship Program provides a monthly stipend to cover living expenses, health care and education to orphans.

Fight against ISIS
Masrour Barzani is one of the most important figures in the international coalition against Daesh. His Security Council, and its elite special forces is attached to the Counter-Terrorism Department (CTD), which has led targeted airstrikes against senior Daesh figures in Iraq and Syria, and rescue missions of hostages.

The American University of Kurdistan (AUK)
Masrour Barzani is the Chairman of the Board of Trustees of The American University of Kurdistan (AUK). He laid the cornerstone of the project during a ceremony in Duhok province in December 2013.

Kurdistan Region Premiership
Following a KDP leadership meeting on 3 December 2018, the party's spokesperson Mahmoud Mohammed named Masrour Barzani for the post of the region's Prime Minister position. in June 2019, Masrour Barzani officially elected as prime minister of Kurdistan Region of Iraq.

See also
 Barzani Family

References

External links 

 Kurdistan Regional Government
 
 

1969 births
Living people
Iraqi Kurdish people
Prime Ministers of Kurdistan Region
Kurdish politicians
Iraqi politicians
Kurdistan Democratic Party politicians
Government of Kurdistan Region
American University alumni